Julien Boyer (born 10 April 1998) is a French professional footballer who plays as a left-back for US Boulogne.

Career
Boyer spent most of his youth career and development with Canet Roussillon before moving to Béziers in 2018. He made his professional debut with Béziers in a 1–1 Ligue 2 tie with Châteauroux on 22 February 2019.

In June 2020, Boyer signed a two-year deal with Clermont Foot, joining the professional group. Unable to break into the Ligue 2 side, he was loaned to Bourg-Péronnas in the Championnat National on 2 November 2020, until the end of the 2020–21 season. On 21 January 2022, Boyer joined Bastia on loan until the end of the season. 

After leaving Clermont in June 2022, Boyer was without contract until 10 January 2023, where he signed with Championnat National 2 side US Boulogne.

References

External links
 
 
 Foot Occitanie Profile

1998 births
Living people
French footballers
Association football fullbacks
AS Béziers (2007) players
US Quevilly-Rouen Métropole players
Clermont Foot players
Football Bourg-en-Bresse Péronnas 01 players
SC Bastia players
US Boulogne players
Ligue 2 players
Championnat National players
Championnat National 3 players